Wild Card is The Rippingtons' thirteenth album, which was released in 2005.

Track listing

Personnel 

The Rippingtons
 Russ Freeman – keyboards, guitars, rhythm programming, arrangements (1-7, 9-13)
 Bill Heller – keyboards, acoustic piano 
 Kim Stone – bass
 Dave Karasony – drums 
 Scott Breadman – percussion 
 Eric Marienthal – saxophones 
 Bill Reichenbach Jr. – trombone 
 Gary Grant – trumpet 
 Jerry Hey – trumpet

Additional personnel
 Ralph Sutton – arrangements (8)
 Lloyd Talbot – arrangements (8)
 Albita Rodriguez – lead vocals (3)
 Asdru Sierra – backing vocals (3)
 Sheffer Bruton – backing vocals (3)
 Willy Chirino – lead and backing vocals (6)
 Chanté Moore – lead and backing vocals (8)

Production
 Russ Freeman – producer, executive producer
 Steve Sykes – associate producer, recording, mixing 
 Andi Howard – executive producer 
 Mark Wexler – executive producer
 Hatsukazu Inagaki – additional recording 
 Marko Ruffalo – additional recording 
 Cornell "Doc" Wiley – additional recording 
 Sonny Mediana – art direction 
 MAD Design – art direction 
 Bill Mayer – illustration 
 Carl Studna – photography

Studios
 Recorded and Mixed at Castle Oaks Recording (Calabasas, CA).
 Additional recording at Latinum Music Studios (Miami, FL) and Surfboard Studios (Boca Raton, FL).

References

The Rippingtons albums
2005 albums